The Journal of Historical Review was a  non-peer reviewed, pseudoacademic periodical focused on advancing Holocaust denial. It was published by the Institute for Historical Review (IHR), based in Torrance, California. It ran quarterly from 1980 until 1992, and then bimonthly from 1993 until publication ceased in 2002. A supplement, IHR Newsletter, was published alongside the journal.

History 
The journal was founded in 1978 by the far-right political activist Willis Carto. Its subject is primarily Holocaust denial. In 1985, Mark Weber joined the IHR's editorial advisory committee and between 1992 and 2000 he was editor of the JHR.

The journal became a platform for neo-Nazis around the world, with the editorial board composed of Holocaust deniers, including Germany (Udo Walendy, Wilhelm Stäglich, and Georg Franz-Willing), France (Robert Faurisson and Henri Roques), Argentina (W. Beweraggi-Allende), Australia (John Tuson Bennett), Spain (Enrique Aynat), and Italy (Carlo Mattogno).

The journal commenced publication in the spring of 1980 as a quarterly periodical. No issues were published between April 1996 and May 1997; it thereafter continued until 2002.  After publication of the journal ceased, the IHR published its Bulletin only in an online format. Back issues are published on the Institute website.

Appraisal 
Its critics include the Anti-Defamation League, the Danish Center for Holocaust and Genocide studies, and scholars including Robert Hanyok, a National Security Agency historian, who have accused the journal of being pseudo-scientific.

The History Teacher wrote that the "[journal] is shockingly racist and antisemitic: articles on 'America's Failed Racial Policy' and anti-Israel pieces accompany those about gas chambers... They clearly have no business claiming to be a continuation of the revisionist tradition, and should be referred to as 'Holocaust Deniers'."

Russian historians Igor Ryzhov and Maria Borodina commented that the fact that the Institute for Historical Review published its own historical journal "helped not only to unite the deniers into a single movement, but also to give their activities a form of pseudo-scientificness."

The Organization of American Historians commissioned a study of the journal in which a panel had found that it was "nothing but a masquerade of scholarship".

References

External links

 , from the Anti-Defamation League.

Fringe science journals
History journals
Holocaust denial in the United States
Holocaust denial
Holocaust historiography
Jewish-American history
Publications established in 1980
Far-right publications in the United States
1980 establishments in California